Ri Kyong Suk (born 1970) is a North Korean singer.

Biography 
Ri Kyong Suk was born to an engineer father and a train driver mother as the eldest of three siblings on 1 January 1970, in the Pyongchon District of Pyongyang. At the age of 7, she began singing in opera productions, where her talent was quickly recognized. She is currently living in the Moranbong District of Pyongyang with her husband Kim Yong Il, a member of the Ministry of Culture and bass guitar player in the Pochonbo Electronic Ensemble. She has a son, Kim Nam Jun and a daughter, Kim Ye Eun.

Career 
Ri's career started in the late 1970s as a singer and actor in opera productions. At age 7, she played a role in the revolutionary opera The Song of Mount Kumgang, and in middle school, she played a role in the famous revolutionary opera titled The Sea of Blood. Around 1985, she was selected by a director from the Korean Film Studio to star in the film Female Teacher.

She joined the newly created Pochonbo Electronic Ensemble in 1988, and quickly became famous in both the North and the South. In 1991, she toured Japan with the Ensemble, performing for Koreans in Japan. After 2000, her fame declined slowly alongside the Ensemble's popularity.

In 2015, Ri performed on 11 October in the 10 000 People Strong Grand Art Performance Celebrating the 70th Anniversary of the Workers' Party of Korea, commonly known as Great Party, Rosy Korea, with the Pochonbo Electronic Ensemble. She also performed in the concert Songs of Memories, held on 21 February 2015, a concert held by older artists, where she could be seen singing Glad to Meet You and My Country is the Best with her bandmates from the Ensemble, earning strong engagement from the audience.

Since then, Ri has been working at the Kim Won Gyun University of Music in Pyongyang as a professor, teaching since 2016. In 2020, she was spotted in a North Korean news broadcast as being part of a propaganda squad, encouraging workers at construction sites. In 2022, she was interviewed during a TV documentary about the film and song "Urban Girl Comes to Get Married".

Filmography

Theater

References 

1970 births
Living people
North Korean women singers
North Korean actresses
Pochonbo Electronic Ensemble
Korean-language singers